The Magnus Baronetcy, of Tangley Hill in Wonersh in the County of Surrey, is a title in the Baronetage of the United Kingdom. It was created on 22 June 1917 for the educationalist and Conservative politician Philip Magnus. He represented London University in the House of Commons from 1906 to 1922. He was succeeded by his grandson, the second Baronet, who was a historian and biographer. In 1951 he assumed by deed poll the additional surname of Allcroft. He died childless and was succeeded by his nephew, the third Baronet and (as of 2022) present holder of the title.

Magnus baronets, of Tangley Hill (1917)
Sir Philip Magnus, 1st Baronet (1842–1933)
Sir Philip Magnus-Allcroft, 2nd Baronet (1906–1988)
Sir Laurence Henry Philip Magnus, 3rd Baronet (b. 1955)

The heir apparent is the present holder’s eldest son Thomas Henry Philip Magnus (b. 1985).

References

External links
 

Magnus